Bold Concert Series is a Canadian English language television series. Bold Concert Series debuted on March 29, 2009 at 7:00 p.m. EST on the Canadian specialty channel, bold.

Premise
In each episode, Bold Concert Series showcases various concerts featuring emerging and indie Canadian artists in an intimate concert setting. Each episode predominantly features live performances by the bands mixed with interview clips throughout.

Bands featured
 Episode 1 - The Stills
 Episode 2 - Two Hours Traffic
 Episode 3 - Land of Talk
 Episode 4 - The Trews
 Episode 5 - Justin Rutledge
 Episode 6 - The Sadies
 Episode 7 - Constantines
 Episode 8 - The Waking Eyes

External links
 bold website

2009 Canadian television series debuts
2000s Canadian documentary television series
2000s Canadian music television series